Marcel Berger (13 May 1885 – 17 November 1966) was a French writer. His work was part of the literature event in the art competition at the 1924 Summer Olympics.

References

1885 births
1966 deaths
19th-century French male writers
20th-century French male writers
Olympic competitors in art competitions
People from Oise